In enzymology, an alpha,alpha-phosphotrehalase is an enzyme that catalyzes the chemical reaction

alpha,alpha-trehalose 6-phosphate + H2O  D-glucose + D-glucose 6-phosphate

Thus, the two substrates of this enzyme are alpha,alpha'-trehalose 6-phosphate and H2O, whereas its two products are D-glucose and D-glucose 6-phosphate.

This enzyme belongs to the family of hydrolases, specifically those glycosidases that hydrolyse O- and S-glycosyl compounds.  The systematic name of this enzyme class is alpha,alpha-trehalose-6-phosphate phosphoglucohydrolase. This enzyme is also called phosphotrehalase.  This enzyme participates in starch and sucrose metabolism.

References

 

EC 3.2.1
Enzymes of unknown structure